The Japanese music media franchise BanG Dream! features a large ensemble of characters, with its main cast organized into seven all-female bands of five members each. The band Poppin'Party serves as the protagonists of the franchise's anime television series, making their debut in 2015.

Four new bands were introduced with the arrival of the BanG Dream! Girls Band Party! mobile game in 2017: Afterglow, Pastel Palettes, Roselia, and Hello, Happy World!. At the end of 2018, a backup band called The Third was renamed Raise A Suilen, with its members portraying new characters. A seventh band named Morfonica was introduced in 2020.

For live performances, Poppin'Party, Roselia, Raise A Suilen, and Morfonica's members play their own music, while the others are limited to vocals as well as voice acting. With the exception of Morfonica, the live bands are prominently featured in the anime's three seasons compared to the other groups, though all seven bands have stories in the game that detail their formation and activities. Various voice actresses also host band-themed online radio and television programs.

Creation and conception
BanG Dream! was founded by Bushiroad president Takaaki Kidani on the premise of voice actresses who could play their own instruments in live concerts. To create the characters and setting, he approached novelist Kō Nakamura; despite having little experience creating fictional bands, two of Nakamura's works were music-based and inspired by his college friends. He shaped Poppin'Party, the first band in the franchise, and its formation after his time in high school. For example, Kasumi meeting her friends is based on Nakamura befriending classmates who wished to create a band; like Kasumi, the guitarist of Nakamura's band bought a guitar at a local pawnshop, while both groups held meetings in a warehouse. Other character aspects were based on their voice actresses, such as Tae holding street performances in the second season of the anime being inspired by Sae Ōtsuka doing the same as a teenager and Chiyu and Risa Tsumugi both being fluent in English. The character designs for Poppin'Party are also loosely modeled after their real-life counterparts. The franchise's first work, the manga BanG_Dream! Star Beat by Nakamura and Aya Ishida, contained numerous differences in character traits that were retconned in later media. The rebooted story takes place in Tokyo's Kita and Shinjuku wards.

The premiere of the anime and launch of BanG Dream! Girls Band Party! in 2017 saw the debuts of Afterglow, Pastel Palettes, Roselia, and Hello, Happy World!. Roselia had first appeared as a live-action group at Tokyo Game Show 2016. Nakamura was not involved in the game's storywriting as developer Craft Egg instead oversaw it.

The Third, a backup band that provided instrumentals for live concerts by Afterglow, Pastel Palettes, and Hello, Happy World!, debuted as its own group alongside Poppin'Party and Roselia in April 2018. The band was later renamed Raise A Suilen. Morfonica, the lone band of the seven with a violinist, was formed in 2020 to celebrate Girls Band Party! three-year anniversary.

Nakamura primarily writes the lyrics for Poppin'Party songs, while Elements Garden's Asuka Oda does so for the other bands.

Many of the characters are high school students, mostly split between Hanasakigawa and Haneoka Girls' High School. As part of Girls Band Party! sixth anniversary, ten characters begin attending college at Yotsuba Women's University or Keiho Women's University.

Poppin'Party

The first band in the BanG Dream! franchise, Poppin'Party (PoPiPa for short) serves as the protagonists of the anime series. Formed by Kasumi Toyama, the band consists of five high school friends who support her in her journey to rediscover the "Star Beat". Although their raw skill is not the best, they make up for this with their strong energy and innate connection between each other. Their name references the "popping" theme of their band and music; before performances, they huddle and recite the chant, "PoPiPa, PiPoPa, PoPiPaPaPiPoPa!".

The first season of the anime focuses on Poppin'Party's creation and efforts to perform at live house Space, while the second and third respectively detail their organization of a self-sponsored concert and participation in the BanG Dream! Girls Band Challenge. In the main story to Girls Band Party!, the band helps the player character recruit bands for the titular event. Poppin'Party has four in-game band stories: "Poppin'Party is Born!" is a retelling of their formation from the anime's first season; "Colorful, Poppin' Candy" follows the band's plans to save the downtown festival; "Double Rainbow" focuses on an argument between Arisa and the others; and "Live Beyond!!"  focuses on the band's participation in the Rocking Star Festival and desire to spread their music.

Poppin'Party is a pop rock band with upbeat music. In accordance with their goals to find the Star Beat, their outfits—which are based on school uniforms—heavily feature a celestial motif.

Kasumi Toyama
 is a third-year student at Hanasakigawa Girls' High School who serves as the leader, lead singer, and rhythm guitarist of Poppin'Party. She plays a red ESP Random Star. Cheerful, active and optimistic, she is always looking for a heart-pounding, sparkling sound called the "Star Beat". Her sister Asuka is a year younger than her, but it is sometimes hard to tell who is the older of the two.

Prior to forming Poppin'Party, Kasumi spends her first weeks of high school searching for the Star Beat, including trying out every club activity. Eventually, she discovers the Random Star at the pawnshop owned by Arisa's family, and a performance by Glitter Green at live house Space ultimately convinces her to start her own band. Despite her upbeat disposition, she takes failure hard, losing her voice due to stress after being told she was the worst-performing band member during their audition at Space. Her friends motivate her to overcome her struggles and continue singing, which ultimately succeeds when they pass their second audition and perform in the final show at the live house. As Poppin'Party's leader, she spearheads much of the band's activities and interactions with other groups, including helping live house CiRCLE organize the Girls Band Party and serving as Hanasakigawa's first-year representative at the end of her first year.

She is voiced by Aimi. In the English dub, Juliet Simmons voices Kasumi.

Contrary to her happy-go-lucky nature in the finalized version, Kasumi is a shy and reserved girl in Star Beat. After being ridiculed for sensing the Star Beat and singing "Twinkle, Twinkle Little Star" as a child, she becomes withdrawn as she enters high school, but wishes to change herself by rediscovering the Star Beat. Upon finding the guitar at Arisa's pawnshop, she is recruited into becoming the protagonist of Arisa's "game" BanG_Dream!. As she learns the instrument, she regains her confidence in performing.

Tae Hanazono
Nicknamed "O-tae",  is the lead guitarist of Poppin'Party and a third-year student at Hanasakigawa. A skilled guitarist who has been playing since she was little, she loves music and works part-time at a live house, the money from which she saved to buy her blue ESP Snapper guitar. A rather airheaded girl, she tends to take things at her own pace, and can be surprising and weird at times. Tae lives with her parents and 20 rabbits, whom she treats like her children.

As first-year students, Tae and Kasumi are classmates who get placed in a remedial home economics class. There, the two bond over their mutual interest in guitar, with Tae teaching Kasumi basic chords. Kasumi attempts to recruit Tae to join the band, but is challenged to impress her by making her "heart race". The effort works when she is inspired by their performance and plays along before formally entering the group. When her childhood friend Rei arrives in Tokyo, Tae is scouted by her and Chiyu to become Raise A Suilen's guitarist. She receives the blessing of Poppin'Party and attempts to play for both bands, but this backfires when she misses Poppin'Party's anniversary concert at the cultural festival. Tae eventually parts ways with RAS after a final live and re-affirms her commitment to Poppin'Party, including writing a song of gratitude. When the one-year anniversary of Poppin'Party's successful audition at Space nears, Tae works with Arisa to organize a party.

Tae is voiced by Sae Ōtsuka. Luci Christian portrays her in the English version.

Her Star Beat counterpart is shy but strong-willed. She joins the band after assisting Kasumi, Arisa, and Rimi in writing the lyrics to their song "Yes! BanG_Dream".

Rimi Ushigome
 is a third-year student at Hanasakigawa and the bassist of Poppin'Party; she is nicknamed "Rimi-rin" by her bandmates. She is very shy and nervous, and efforts to overcome this have not resulted in success so far. Rimi plays a pink ESP Viper bass, which was a hand-me-down from her older sister Yuri Ushigome of Glitter Green. She loves the chocolate cornets from Yamabuki Bakery and chocolate (outside of mint chocolate) and sweets in general. Contrary to her meek personality, she also enjoys horror entertainment like paranormal fiction and zombie films as long as they are not excessively grotesque. Rimi grew up in the Kansai region before moving in middle school, and she occasionally speaks with a Kansai dialect whenever she is panicking.

On the day of their high school entrance ceremony, Kasumi's bright and cheery self-introduction makes Rimi want to get to know her more. Although she reveals to Kasumi that she is related to Yuri and can play the bass, her anxiety makes her hesitate and decline Kasumi's invitation to her band. When Glitter Green is running late for their concert at Space, she joins Kasumi on stage for a rendition of "Twinkle, Twinkle, Little Star". After their improvised performance buys enough time for her sister's band to arrive, Rimi agrees to join. In addition to playing the bass, Rimi is Poppin'Party's main songwriter, and her friends note her songs have a positive impact on the band. She has a tendency to compare herself to her older sister, which leads to writer's block when she is tasked with writing a theme song for the downtown shopping district, though she gradually learns to develop her own image with her band's help. During the Girls Band Challenge, Rimi and Arisa partner to create a promotional music video for Poppin'Party, though the fun she has during the competition causes her to worry about its conclusion ahead of the final before being comforted by the support of the fans and her bandmates.

Rimi is voiced by Rimi Nishimoto. She is voiced by Avery Smithhart in the English dub.

In Star Beat, Rimi is depicted as a mysterious girl who enjoys eating rice and pretending to be a ninja.

Sāya Yamabuki
 is the drummer of Poppin'Party and a third-year student at Hanasakigawa. She performs with a Pearl drum kit. A kindhearted soul, Sāya always tries to be a good friend to Kasumi and those around her. On top of her high school studies and the band, she helps out at her family's popular business, the Yamabuki Bakery. She has a brother, Jun, and sister, Sana, who are a lot younger than her.

She became friends with Kasumi at their high school entrance ceremony and the two have eaten lunch together every day since. Although she watches as Kasumi grows the band, she initially refuses to become a member as she worries she would burden the band and her family; this fear stemmed from her middle school days, when she was part of the band CHiSPA until her mother fell ill. Despite her reluctance, she receives her mother and Kasumi's support to return to music, becoming the final member of Poppin'Party. Due to her nature, Sāya expresses discontent about the band's future when Arisa lashes at Rimi due to stress and Tae is invited to play with Raise A Suilen but worries that her thoughts are selfish. The band ultimately makes amends on both occasions as Sāya expresses her desire to keep playing with them.

Sāya is voiced by Ayaka Ōhashi. Christina Kelly voices her in the English dub.

The Star Beat version of Sāya does not appear until later in the manga, though she spends the early chapters communicating with Kasumi by writing on her desk. Although she urges Kasumi to form a band with the others and helps her complete the lyrics to "Yes! BanG_Dream", she is hesitant to join.

Arisa Ichigaya
 is the keyboardist of Poppin'Party and a third-year student at Hanasakigawa. She plays a Roland Juno-DS61 keyboard. Arisa is very much an indoor girl who likes taking care of her bonsai trees and looking at stuff online. She does not go out much, but is incredibly smart and excels academically, including being the top pianist at her music school. Her sharp tongue causes her and Kasumi to frequently butt heads, though she tries to keep the appearance of a rich and refined girl around others. Her grandmother runs the pawnshop Ryuseido.

Before meeting Kasumi, Arisa frequently skipped classes, leading to rumors that she was actually a ghost. She is initially opposed to Kasumi's proposal of forming a band and attempts to sell off the Random Star, but caves and is later responsible for creating the Poppin'Party name. Although her friends' antics exasperate her, such as scheduling practices in her basement without her permission, she is dedicated to Poppin'Party, including leading the band in creating a music video and increasing their performances to gain traction in the BanG Dream! Girls Band Challenge. However, her isolated nature also clashes at times with the group; when her grades start to drop shortly before a live performance, she proclaims to her teacher that she would be able to record a high score on her exams and perform on the same day, but the pressure and her unwillingness to reveal her conversation with the teacher causes her to lash out at Rimi. Although wrought by guilt, she brings herself to confide in them her goals and they make amends. She becomes the secretary of Hanasakigawa's student council during her second year of high school, figuring such a position would have a positive effect on her report card. As a senior, Arisa is named student council vice president.

Arisa is voiced by Ayasa Itō. Maggie Flecknoe voices her in the English version.

In Star Beat, Arisa is a hikikomori who plays video games. She introduces Kasumi to the Random Star at her pawnshop like in the current series, which she allows her to play on the agreement that Kasumi join her "game".

Afterglow
A band of childhood friends led by Himari Uehara, Afterglow was formed after Ran Mitake was placed in a different class from the others in middle school. The five live by the creed of maintaining their friendship; in accordance with keeping their status quo, they have a "rough-around-the-edges" aesthetic and their music centers on their camaraderie. The name comes from the English term for the effect on the sky following a sunset, stemming from the friends regularly watching the sunset together.

In the anime's second season, Afterglow participates in a shopping district festival with Poppin'Party, followed by the latter's self-sponsored live. The band skips the Girls Band Challenge in the third season due to scheduling conflicts. Afterglow has three band stories in Girls Band Party!: "Afterglow, The Same As Always" focuses on Ran's relationship with her father and his disapproval of the band; "Tied to the Skies" revolve around her growth and her bandmates' fears that they are being left behind; and "One of Us" follows the band entering the Melodic Rain music event.

, Afterglow has produced 21 songs. Seven have been released as singles. The band's first album One of Us was released on March 24, 2021.

Ran Mitake
 is the lead singer and rhythm guitarist of Afterglow, and a third-year student at Haneoka Girls' High School. Ran's family has a 100-year history as experts in ikebana flower arrangement. She is strong-willed, hates losing, and gets lonely easily due to her awkward and aloof nature. Ran deeply treasures her time with her friends, and regularly says the phrase "Same as always" as a compliment of her band's performances. Although she is officially not the band's leader, she has to make decisions for them at times as Himari doesn't have a strong-enough will to do so. Due to her band's emphasis on the bonds between its members over musical skill, she considers Yukina and Roselia to be Afterglow's rivals.

During her second year of middle school, Ran was assigned to a different class from her friends, ending a streak of the five being classmates dating to elementary school. Due to her quiet nature, she struggles to make acquaintances in her new class, prompting her to skip lessons to retreat to the school rooftop. On the roof, she vents her frustrations via poems, which are eventually turned into Afterglow's song lyrics. Ran is pushed by her friends to become the vocalist as she understands the lyrics, but she chooses to also play the guitar to keep her hands occupied on-stage. When the band becomes popular in the area and seeks to participate in the Girl Jam competition, Ran's father disapproves and orders her to prioritize flower arrangement; the pressures of the event and her family cause Ran to become withdrawn and lash out at her bandmates. After making amends with her friends, she confronts her father about her dedication to Afterglow and invites him to Girl Band Jam. Upon watching them perform, he changes his mind and accepts the band's importance to her.  As Ran continues flower arranging in addition to the band, her bandmates fear their status quo is being disrupted by Ran's changing commitments, including their inability to comprehend her proposed lyrics. When the five meet and reconcile after watching the sunset and sunrise, Ran changes her lyrics to reflect the friends remaining connected even as she develops as a person.

Ran is voiced by Ayane Sakura. Sakura was initially skeptical of portraying Ran due to her inexperience in music, but agreed to join after being intrigued by Afterglow's premise. Courtney Lomelo voices Ran in the English dub.

Moca Aoba
 is the lead guitarist of Afterglow and a third-year student at Haneoka. Moca is entirely indifferent to things she does not have interest in, but will do just about anything for her friends, especially Ran whom she's particularly close with. She loves manga and the buns from Yamabuki Bakery, and works part-time at a convenience store with Lisa. Moca has a habit of calling herself "Moca-chan" when she's feeling really confident, and regularly gives nicknames to her friends and the people around her.

Despite her sleepy and sometimes annoying nature, Moca is sharp and understands the concerns of her friends, serving as a mediator for various in-band disputes. For instance, as a child, she is the first to approach Ran and invite her to play with the friends at the park. In middle school, she also catches on to Ran's behavior after being in a separate class. When the band becomes fractured by Ran repeatedly distancing herself prior to Girl Jam, Moca directly starts an argument in Tsugumi's hospital room that boils over until they are chided by a nurse, causing them to realize their friendship is too strong to be broken by petty disagreements. Although Moca supports Ran's growth, she develops a fear of being left behind and being unable to help her, which is eventually alleviated when Ran expresses her appreciation for her presence.

She is voiced by Sachika Misawa. Misawa is a co-host of the Afterglow radio show Sunset STUDIO. Moca is voiced by Cat Thomas in the dub.

Himari Uehara
 is the bassist and leader of Afterglow and a third-year student at Haneoka and a member of their tennis club. A cheerful and good-natured girl, she gets teased a lot by her bandmates. She is not great at reading between the lines and her efforts can sometimes be fruitless. Himari is easily moved to tears when she feels touched and in many ways, relies on other members to make decisions. She also likes baking and comparing sweets from different convenience stores. Moca calls her "Hii-chan".

In middle school, Himari frequently invites her friends out to karaoke sessions as she enjoys the feeling of performing. When the others agree with her but point out they cannot afford to keep going, Tsugumi proposes forming the band. Himari chooses the bass after hearing Tomoe suggest the instrument while asking about roles in a band. A close friend of Lisa, Himari admires her fellow bassist and upperclassman's reliability and aspires to emulate her, though her bandmates insist she is capable enough on her own thanks to her actions and support for them.

Emiri Katō voices Himari. Chaney Moore serves as her English voice actress.

Tomoe Udagawa
 is the drummer of Afterglow and a third-year student at Haneoka. Tomoe is a candid girl who never badmouths others and carries no regrets. She gets along well with the adults in the shopping district, playing the taiko drums for them in local festivals. Like her younger sister Ako, she has a weak spot for fashion. Outside of the band, Tomoe works part-time at the fast food restaurant and is a member of Haneoka's dance club. Moca calls her "Tomo-chin".

Tomoe become's the band's drummer thanks to her taiko experience. When Ran distances herself from the band prior to Girl Jam due to her father, Tomoe confronts her but inadvertently offends her when she argues Ran does not disclose her family life to them. After Ran and Moca begin fighting, Tomoe attempts to intervene but gets dragged into the quarrel until they are scolded by the head nurse and reconcile. Tomoe also calls the band for an emergency rooftop meeting when the others struggle to keep up with Ran as she progresses with flower arrangement, explaining her wish to let the "same as always" by watching the sunset again. Outside of the band, Tomoe maintains a cool image that Ako admires, though Ako's improved performances with Roselia prompts Tomoe to question her presence in her younger sister's growth. Eventually, she elects to continue her upbeat attitude, reasoning that she is satisfied as long as it makes Ako happy.

Tomoe is voiced by Yōko Hikasa, and is voiced by Celeste Roberts in the dub.

Tsugumi Hazawa
 is the keyboardist of Afterglow and a third-year student at Haneoka where she is also the Vice President of the student council. Nicknamed "Tsugu" by her friends and the most ordinary girl in the band, Tsugumi has a positive personality that keeps the band members' spirits high. Outside of the band, she works at her family's coffee shop, while her hobbies include stargazing and reading manga.

To her friends' surprise, Tsugumi is responsible for forming Afterglow, doing so to remain close with Ran; she becomes the band's keyboardist as she played the piano growing up. Tsugumi pushes the band to join Girl Jam, though she overworks herself between worrying about the band and her student council duties, causing her to collapse and be hospitalized. Her hospitalization leads her friends to her room, where Ran and Moca argue until they are able to resolve the situation. She later develops a rapport with the Hikawa twins, befriending Sayo during a baking class and working alongside Hina on the Haneoka student council during her second year of high school, and becomes a mentor to Tsukushi when she begins working at Hazawa Coffee. Tsugumi becomes the student council president as a senior.

Hisako Kanemoto portrays Tsugumi. Alongside Sachika Misawa, Kanemoto co-hosts Sunset STUDIO. Tsugumi is voiced by Allison Sumrall in the dub version.

Pastel Palettes
Stylized as Pastel＊Palettes, the group is an "idol band" formed as a gimmick by a talent agency. Though they were initially not expected to play their own instruments in live performances, they began doing so after technical errors plagued their debut. This original approach has ultimately turned them into a popular group. "Pastel Palettes" refers to the colorful and varied personalities of the band, with each member's outfit being bright and frilly and heavy use of harmonization between the five in their songs.

Pastel Palettes' anime debut comes in the second season when they join the World Idol Festival and Poppin'Party's live. The group has three band stories in the game: "Pastel Palettes, The Beginning" covers their creation and efforts to rebound from their disastrous debut; "Luminous Once More" discusses the members' dreams and goals as their activities together are hamstrung by other obligations, and "Title Idol" follows their relationship with a new idol unit formed by their talent agency.

, Pastel Palettes is responsible for 20 songs and seven singles. Their debut album Title Idol was released on May 19, 2021.

Aya Maruyama
 is the vocalist of Pastel Palettes and a first-year literature student at Yotsuba. An alumna of Hanasakigawa, she gets worked up easily and tends to cry a lot, though outwardly she's very cheery, high-spirited, and bubbly. She has weird skills such as knowing how to take a perfect selfie and wishes that people would recognize her when she's outside, hence why she doesn't wear her disguise in public. Outside of the band, she works part-time at the fast food store together with Kanon.

An avid admirer of various idol groups, Aya was an idol trainee for three years before being chosen as Pastel Palettes' lead singer. Despite the band's failed debut performance, she salvages their reputation by selling tickets to their next concert herself even in the middle of a rainstorm. When her talent agency considers barring her from singing in the show due to her inexperience, her determination to sing and the help of her bandmates convince them otherwise. While she is the band's leader, her general unreliability casts her in a different light among her bandmates, who occasionally try to keep her from attempting difficult tasks.

She was voiced by Ami Maeshima, who co-hosted the variety show Bandori! TV with Aimi, until her departure on November 30, 2022. Mai Le voices Aya in the dub.

Hina Hikawa
 is the guitarist of Pastel Palettes, a first-year student at Keiho, and the younger twin sister of Sayo. She is a true genius, able to do just about anything after one single demonstration. She is a cheerful and candid girl, though she struggles to understand the feelings of other people (especially when it comes to them working hard for their dreams) and gets easily bored. Hina regularly uses weird words to describe various emotions, such as "boppin' (るん)" and "zappin' (ピピツ)".

Seeking something interesting to do, Hina joins Pastel Palettes after passing her audition with ease. As the band grows in popularity, Hina attracts fans who are amused and entertained by her odd personality. Although initially perplexed, she realizes her enjoyment as a Pastel Palettes member also stems from her curiosity about other people. Outside of Pastel Palettes, Hina is especially attached to Sayo and wishes to spend time with her, hence why she chose to play the guitar. Despite Sayo's initial attempts to separate herself from Hina, the two gradually get along and pledge to support each other in their musical careers. After serving as student council president of Haneoka in her senior year, she becomes an antropology student at Keiho.

Ari Ozawa voices Hina, while she is portrayed by Katelyn Barr in the dub.

Chisato Shirasagi
 is the bassist of Pastel Palettes, a first-year literature student at Yotsuba, and Kaoru's childhood friend. Having been a famous actress since she was a child, Chisato has learned to cherish her private life and the friends therein. Underneath her kind and pleasant outlook, she can be quite calculating and even blunt and cold at times, especially towards Kaoru's dramatic personality. She is also close friends with Kanon, whom she met in Hanasakigawa's junior high and befriended as the latter was the first to treat her like a regular person rather than a celebrity.

After Pastel Palettes' disastrous debut performance, a skeptical Chisato attempts to leave the band as she feels she could not remain with a failing project that would ruin her reputation, but the ongoing negative publicity and potential fallout should she quit force her to stay. Although pessimistic about the band's future, Chisato is surprised when she sees Aya attempting to sell tickets to Pastel Palettes' next concert in the rain; inspired, she finally commits to the band. Though she is seen as a role model for professionalism by the other girls, they are unaware of her hard work and effort to do well. After graduating high school, Chisato matriculates at Yotsuba and begins sharing an apartment with Kanon.

Sumire Uesaka voices Chisato, while Patricia Duran voices her in the dub.

Maya Yamato
 is the drummer of Pastel Palettes with glasses and a first-year sociology student at Keiho. Happiest when surrounded by musical equipment, Maya is a true tech geek who becomes almost impossible to stop when talking about her beloved hobby, and completely loses track of time when she starts tinkering with all kinds of parts and equipment. She was a member of Haneoka's drama club.

Prior to joining Pastel Palettes, she was a studio musician working for the agency. Unlike the other instruments that could be faked for the idol band gimmick, the agency required an actual drummer, leading to the staff presenting Maya as an interim drummer. Although she enjoys her time with Pastel Palettes, Maya initially struggles with her presence in the band as she feels she does not fit the proper image of an idol due to her interests and awkward nature. With her friends' support, she realizes her positive influence on her fans and embraces her personality. Maya also works as a columnist for an idol magazine, regularly writing about music equipment.

Ikumi Nakagami voices Maya, while Chelsea McCurdy does so for the dub.

Eve Wakamiya
 is the keyboardist of Pastel Palettes and a third-year student at Hanasakigawa, making her the youngest but the tallest member of the band. She is half-Japanese and half-Finnish and grew up in Finland. Eve is fairly easygoing and kind to everyone, loves and is fascinated by Japanese culture, and believes in the way of bushido. Outside of the band, she is a member of Hanasakigawa's flower arrangement, kendo, and tea ceremony clubs. Eve is also a part-time employee at Hazawa Coffee.

Before joining Pastel Palettes, she was a model at the agency. A classmate of Kasumi's during her first year, Eve quickly befriends Poppin'Party and Hello, Happy World!'s members when they participate in a sakura viewing party. Due to her friendly nature, she struggles with lying when she wishes to impress her Finnish friend Hanne upon her arrival in Japan, and with quelling an argument between Pastel Palettes fans during a live concert. She eventually overcomes these tribulations with her bandmates and ideals learned from bushido.

Eve is voiced by former SKE48 member Sawako Hata, while she is portrayed by Skyler Sinclair in the dub.

Roselia

A popular Gothic rock band that is recognized at a near-professional level and has caught the eye of the music industry. Their name is a combination of "rose" and "camellia", a reference to a blue rose as it represents the band's goals of achieving the impossible. With music that also contain symphonic metal leanings, Roselia's shows are based on visual kei with elaborate costumes and impressive visuals.

In the first season of the anime, Roselia plays a minor role by performing at Space's final show. The band's presence is increased to a co-starring role in the second and third seasons as its members organize a self-sponsored show and participate in the Girls Band Challenge. In the game, their primary goal is to perform at the prestigious Future World Fes. Roselia has three band stories: "Bloom of the Blue Rose" details their creation; "Neo-Aspect" follows their efforts to rediscover their pride after a poor performance; and "Sprechchor" focuses on the band's thoughts on becoming a professional group. The first two band stories and the "Noble Rose" event story trilogy are also covered in the two-part film series Episode of Roselia.

Yukina Minato
 is the leader and perfectionist vocalist of Roselia who takes everything in regards to music very seriously. She has sung for as long as she can remember, taking inspiration from her father whose burgeoning music career ended after he was forced to abandon making his own music and sell out. Although she is usually cold and stoic, she would show her softer side to people she eventually warms up to. She is best and childhood friends with Lisa. Outside of the band, she is a first-year music student at Yotsuba after previously attending Haneoka Girls' High School. Yukina also secretly loves cats.

Prior to Roselia's formation, Yukina was a solo performer at various live houses in the area who sought to form the perfect group to perform at Future World Fes. Despite the band's early success, Yukina secretly holds meetings with agents to expedite her entry into Future World Fes on her own, resulting in a falling-out when Ako and Rinko find out. Upon realizing her personal motives had hurt the others and her desire to keep the group together, she declines the agents' offers and continues performing with Roselia. The band later plays at the Sweet Music Shower event, but a poor performance prompts Yukina to revert to her colder nature in an effort to restore their sound, leading to Ako running away. Upon attending a Poppin'Party concert, she realizes she and her bandmates had lost pride in themselves, and resolves to rediscover that feeling and love for being part of Roselia. After the band hosts a self-sponsored show, Yukina is approached by Chiyu about becoming Roselia's producer but is rebuked, sparking a one-sided grudge between the latter and Roselia. After Chiyu challenges Roselia to enter the Girls Band Challenge and to a Battle of the Bands, Yukina agrees to participate despite her group's intentions to focus on Future World Fes, feeling that the events would help Roselia grow. A successful show at Future World Fes allows her to realize that she has finally surpassed her father and created her own identity as a musician.

Aina Aiba portrays Yukina, while Olivia Swasey is her voice actress in the dub.

Sayo Hikawa
 is the guitarist of Roselia and a first-year law student at Keiho. She plays an ESP M-II guitar. Serious to a fault and never cuts corners, she is the older twin sister of Hina; Sayo has an inferiority complex because Hina always manages to do things perfectly without trying, while Sayo always puts her absolute effort into everything but is unable to perform as well as her. She dislikes carrots passionately as she used to eat Hina's (who disliked them as well) when they were younger, and got scolded for it because she did not eat her own. Sayo previously attended Hanasakigawa Girls' High School, where she was in the archery club and the student council's disciplinary committee.

After playing for various bands but repeatedly leaving after questioning her bandmates' talents, Sayo becomes the first person to join Roselia after being approached by Yukina. Despite her early misgivings about Roselia, she commits to the band in her effort to differentiate herself from Hina. As a result, she is constantly peeved whenever she spots Hina in the crowd during Roselia's concerts. In spite of her complex, Sayo wishes to be honest toward Hina and promises that the two will motivate each other in playing the guitar. When the Girls Band Challenge begins, Sayo is reluctant to take part in it and Roselia's battle with Raise A Suilen due to Future World Fes, but after visiting Chiyu's penthouse and hearing her explanations, she is motivated to defeat RAS. However, after Roselia is defeated and switches to preparing for the preliminary event Over the Future, she overworks herself and collapses after a practice. While recovering from her fever, Sayo writes a song that Roselia later performs at the Girls Band Challenge final.

Sayo is voiced by Haruka Kudō. Kudō and fellow Roselia member Megu Sakuragawa host the Nippon Broadcasting System program Radio Shout!. Elissa Cuellar plays her in the dub.

Lisa Imai
 is the bassist of Roselia, a first-year international studies student at Yotsuba, and Yukina's best friend and neighbor since childhood. She has the appearance of a gyaru, but often does things that does not suit that image and ends up hiding it. In fact, Lisa is a very compassionate girl who loves taking care of others, social, and has lots of friends, and also loves baking cookies, in which she is even called as the mother of Roselia. Outside of the band, she works part-time in a convenience store with Moca and used to be in Haneoka's dance and tennis clubs.

Growing up with Yukina, Lisa used to play the bass before stopping to focus on her nails. When Sayo points out Roselia needs a bassist, Lisa offers to fill in for practices but becomes a permanent member after impressing the others. Although Lisa feels she is the least experienced musician in the band, her outgoing and helpful personality keeps the members content. Nevertheless, she is keen on supporting the band musically, including attempting to write lyrics. Ahead of Future World Fes, she questions her reasons for being part of Roselia, but conversations with her bandmates and reminiscing about her youth with Yukina prompts her to recall wishing to support her childhood friend in music.

Lisa was originally voiced by Yurika Endō until her retirement in May 2018, and Yuki Nakashima took over as her replacement. In the English dub, Lisa is portrayed by Nastasia Marquez.

Ako Udagawa
 is the drummer of Roselia and younger sister to Tomoe, whom she admires a lot and shares a passion of goth and punk fashion with. She is a second-year student at Haneoka, making her the youngest member of Roselia and the shortest member. She is known to often have chūnibyō tendencies, which could be the result of the time she spent playing games online. She is best friends with bandmate Rinko, whom she met through the online game Neo Fantasy Online. Outside of the band, she is classmates with Rokka and Asuka, and is also a member of her school's dance club.

Prior to Roselia's formation, Ako was a fan of Yukina who frequently attended her solo performances. She attempts to join Yukina's new band, but is constantly turned down until Lisa convinces Yukina to let her audition. When Roselia disappoints at Sweet Music Shower and Yukina reverts to her strict nature, Ako is the first to point out the band's discord. With motivation from Tomoe, she and Rinko work together to reunite the band. Although Ako greatly admires Tomoe, the older sister finds herself discontent with Ako's continually-improving drumming as she starts to feel unneeded. When the two discuss the matter, Ako explains she took up drumming and joined the dance club to follow in Tomoe's footsteps, convincing Tomoe to not disclose her concerns as she wants to continue being Ako's inspiration.

She is voiced by Megu Sakuragawa, who co-hosts Radio Shout! with Kudō. Julia Traber voices Ako in the dub.

Rinko Shirokane
 is the keyboardist of Roselia and a first-year music student at Yotsuba. Rinko has played the piano ever since she was young and has won various awards at piano competitions. She is extremely shy and asocial, getting easily scared if she was around a large crowd or people she is unfamiliar with. As such, she does not go out much, is easily embarrassed, and tends to be a pessimist. In her free time, she likes to read and play online games, meeting her best friend Ako in the latter; Ako also calls her "Rin-rin".

She is the last to join Roselia, doing so after playing along to videos of the band's rehearsals and passing her audition. Due to her shy disposition, Rinko hesitates at performing live but proclaims her wish to play with the band. As a skilled sewer, she designs Roselia's costumes, each with varying themes; for example, the band's "Neo-Aspect" outfits feature a clock-inspired motif to symbolize the stoppage of time (after an argument causes them to separate) and the clock hands' movement as one (upon reconciling). During her second year of high school, Rinko tries out for various clubs—though she ultimately declines to join any of them—in an effort to build up the courage to join a piano competition that she had participated in as a child but ended poorly. Despite her doubts about returning to the event and questions on why she enjoys playing the piano, she finds the motivation to do so upon recalling how the instrument helps her express her feelings beyond words. Rinko becomes Hanasakigawa's student council president as a senior in an effort to combat her nerves while also helping others.

Satomi Akesaka portrayed Rinko until sensorineural hearing loss forced her to leave the band and the BanG Dream! project in September 2018. Open auditions were held to find her successor, and Kanon Shizaki took over as Rinko in November. Cynthia Martinez voices Rinko in the dub.

Hello, Happy World!
Hello, Happy World!, often shorthanded to HaroHapi (ハロハピ) was formed by Kokoro Tsurumaki in her dream of making people smile all around the world. The band is popular with children and they often perform at preschools and children's hospitals, though their music has appeal across all age ranges from big band ("Goka! Gokai!? Phantom Thief!") to hip hop ("Worldwide Treasure!"). They are named after their sole mission to "make the world happy" through their music. Their catchphrase is "Happy, Lucky, Smile, Yay~!" ("Happy, Lucky, Smile, Hooray~!" in the localization), which is also shortened to "HLSY".

In the anime's second season, the band helps Poppin'Party with planning their self-sponsored show before participating in it themselves. In the game, Hello, Happy World! has three band stories: "Smiles To The World! Hello, Happy Union!" details their creation and helping an injured friend; "I Need You!" focuses on their plans to restore an old amusement park; and "Smile Connection!" details their trip to a foreign country.

19 songs and seven singles have been released by Hello, Happy World! . Smile Connection!, the band's first album, was released on July 14, 2021.

Kokoro Tsurumaki
 is the leader and vocalist of the band and a third-year student at Hanasakigawa. Coming from a well-off family, Kokoro typically gets to do anything she wants, and also lives in one of the biggest houses in the area. Kokoro is extremely curious by nature and her eyes glitter whenever she encounters something new. Loves to see others smile and wishes to make the whole world smile through music. Hagumi and Kasumi call her "Kokoron". According to Misaki, she's more likely a carefree girl who does not care about anything, thus explaining her ignorance over Misaki being Michelle and her ignorance on the changes of other people; despite this, she truly cares for her bandmates. Kokoro is shown to be very acrobatic—frequently doing cartwheels and even leaping from heights—and is skilled in parkour, which makes her very popular among the underclassmen.

Kokoro forms Hello, Happy World! while looking for something fun to do. Due to her wealthy background and optimistic personality, she frequently leads the band in absurd activities like restoring a dilapidated amusement park and going on an island adventure. When Poppin'Party struggles to find inspiration for their self-sponsored show, Kokoro helps them by organizing an event on her personal cruise ship to make them smile.

She is voiced by Miku Itō. Itō joined the project after expressing amusement and fascination at Hello, Happy World!'s description provided by Bushiroad; despite initial concerns about portraying Kokoro due to the demands of the character's hyperactive personality, Itō figured "not to think too deeply" when voicing her. She co-hosts the online franchise news show HaroHapi CiRCLE Broadcast with Moe Toyota. Kokoro is voiced by Natalie Rial in the dub.

Kaoru Seta
 is the guitarist of the band, a first-year student at Yotsuba, and Chisato's childhood friend. A popular girl in her school's drama club, Kaoru is constantly surrounded by her fans, whom she calls "little kittens"; this is a stark contrast to her shy personality during her youth with Chisato, which she shed in middle school to become a stronger person. She enjoys reading poetry and books on philosophy and reciting lines from Shakespeare, but she does not necessarily understand what she's reading or quoting. For instance, she claims to like sachertorte and vichyssoise because they sound cool, but in reality likes common foods like miso soup. Although she is generally self-confident, she can be sensitive about others and also gets flustered whenever she meets Chisato, who often teases her about her private life.

As Kokoro believes the guitarist is the biggest face in a band, she invites Kaoru to join Hello, Happy World! despite the latter's lone experience with the instrument being an acting role as a guitarist. In the drama club, Kaoru often collaborates with members of other bands for concerts, including Roselia's Yukina and Rinko, Pastel Palettes' Chisato and Maya, and Afterglow's Tomoe and Himari. She later befriends Morfonica's Tōko after the younger student approaches her for help with adding showmanship to her performances.

Azusa Tadokoro serves as Kaoru's voice actress, while Shanae'a Moore is her dub voice actress.

Hagumi Kitazawa
 is the bassist of the band and a third-year student at Hanasakigawa. Her family owns a meat shop, whose croquettes are quite famous in town. An animated and happy girl with a genuine heart, she is Kasumi's classmate and childhood friend. Her lightning-fast reflexes make her an ace at softball and she is the captain of her high school team.

She joins Hello, Happy World! after meeting Kokoro and the others in the shopping district. Although she was not familiar with the bass prior to the band, her older brother taught her how to play the guitar, easing the transition to the new instrument. Hagumi helps the band through its first activity when the five try to cheer up her softball teammate Akari, who had suffered an injury in an accident.

Hagumi is voiced by Yuri Yoshida, while her dub counterpart is voiced by Elizabeth Byrd.

Kanon Matsubara
 is the drummer of the band, a first-year literature student at Kaiho, and employee at the fast food restaurant with Aya. She is a shy, nervous and clumsy girl who tends to get caught up in matters she was never a part of; when overwhelmed, she has a tendency to say "fuee". However, she also tries her best to keep the band's antics down a notch. Kanon has no sense of direction, though she can easily find coffee shops by their smell. She is nicknamed "Kano-chan-senpai" by Hagumi, and is close friends and college roommates with Chisato. At Hanasakigawa, she was part of their Tea Ceremony Club.

She is the first to join Hello, Happy World! when Kokoro encounters her as she is trying to find the music store to sell her drums; Kokoro then drags her into a street performance before enlisting her into the band. Although Kanon is often forced into the band's shenanigans against her will, she has shown competence in managing such situations such as leading the five during their island quest. Kanon also credits the band with helping her open up and becoming more social "with the power of a smile."

Moe Toyota portrays Kanon. Toyota co-hosts HaroHapi CiRCLE Broadcast with Itō. Christie Guidry plays Kanon in the dub.

Misaki Okusawa
 is the DJ of the band, a third-year student at Hanasakigawa, and a member of her school's tennis club. Under the guise of a pink bear costume she used to wear for a part-time job, she goes by the stage name  while the band considers Misaki herself the band's composer and Michelle's "agent" or "friend". Misaki is very reserved and sarcastic, tends to react poorly to her band's crazy and wild antics, and has a hard time staying positive no matter the situation. Hagumi calls her "Mii-kun". Misaki also likes making felt dolls for her little sister as a hobby.

Seeking an easy part-time job, Misaki applies for an unknown position—to her dismay, she discovers it is serving as the shopping district's mascot Michelle. While on the job, she encounters Kokoro and is dragged into helping her recruit new members to the band. Despite her doubts and attempts to quit, Misaki eventually embraces her place in the band. Her discomfort returns during the band's amusement park restoration efforts when she questions her role in the band, but a conversation with Kokoro convinces her that she has a place in the group beyond Michelle. Regardless, she continues to finds herself exasperated by her bandmates' shenanigans; to her pain, none of them, aside from Kanon who sympathizes with her, believe that she is Michelle. Misaki becomes Hanasakigawa's student council president as a senior.

Misaki is voiced by Tomoyo Kurosawa, while she is voiced by Shannon Emerick in the dub.

Raise A Suilen

Raise A Suilen (stylized as RAISE A SUILEN and sometimes referred to as RAS) is a group originally formed as a backup band to fill the instruments for live shows by groups whose voice actresses were unable to play music. Being the third band in the BanG Dream! universe to perform live (after Poppin'Party and Roselia), RAS was initially simply referred to as The Third (Beta) before receiving its own name and in-universe characters during their second live concert on July 17, 2018.

The band debuts in the anime's second season before becoming the focal story of the third. RAS was added to Girls Band Party! on June 10, 2020. Their first band story "Raise the Curtain" is a retelling of the anime's third season, while the second "Coruscate -DNA-" follows Chiyu's family.

Rei Wakana
, who performs with the stage name , is the band's vocalist and bassist. A third-year high school student, she is Tae's childhood friend and promised that the two would form a band together.

Prior to Raise A Suilen's formation, Rei was a session musician until she was recruited by Chiyu. She later returns to Tokyo, where she reunites with Tae and invites her to create a band together. Although the two join RAS and enjoy early popularity, Rei learns that Tae is already a member of Poppin'Party and realizes that she has been keeping Tae from them. Upon talking with Masuki, she decides to support Tae and accept Poppin'Party.

Raychell is Rei's voice actress. Shelley Calene-Black portrays her in the dub.

Masuki Satō
She is a third-year high school student at the prestigious Shirayuki Private Academy, an all-girls' Catholic school that her mother—an alumna—encouraged her to attend. She is the daughter of Live House Galaxy's owner, who was the drummer for the band Death Galaxy. Despite her harsh look, she likes cute things and baking. Nicknamed "King" by her peers, she is popular with other drummers like Ako and Maya.

Due to her wild drumming style, Masuki's tenures with other bands were short lived before being scouted by Chiyu. When Raise A Suilen is seeking a guitarist prior to the Girls Band Challenge, Masuki convinces Rokka to audition after hearing her practice; although Rokka is initially rejected, she grows close with Masuki who offers her support until she is accepted. When Chiyu confronts Masuki and the others for mingling with the others despite dropping in the voting, an incensed Masuki storms out, which Rokka misinterprets as her quitting the band. Raise A Suilen eventually makes amends and participates in the finals.

Masuki is voiced by Natsume. Molly Searcy portrays her in the dub.

Chiyu Tamade
She is a 14-year-old girl who had skipped grades to become a third-year high school student at Celosia Girls' Academy, an international school. Due to her overseas education, she is fluent in English and tends to include English words while talking. Her mother is a decorated violinist, a pedigree that Chiyu struggles to live up to until she becomes a producer.

She originally wanted to join Roselia as a producer but was rejected by Yukina Minato, prompting her to form Raise A Suilen to take on Roselia. Chiyu decides to steal Tae from Poppin'Party in order to defeat them, though her plan ultimately fails; in Tae's place, she is forced to rely on a backing track for guitar as auditions for replacement guitarists do not produce results. She enters RAS into the Girls Band Challenge and recruits Rokka after finding a video of her cultural festival performance. Although RAS enjoys success in the Challenge voting, Chiyu grows annoyed at her band members interacting with Poppin'Party and Roselia and forbids them from meeting. When the band's members part ways and Reona disappears as a result, she becomes despondent until she is motivated by Rei to reconcile. Upon making amends with Reona, Chiyu becomes more sociable toward the other bands ahead of the Girls Band Challenge, though she maintains her air of professionalism. Following the Girls Band Challenge, she begins helping other bands whenever needed.

Chiyu is voiced by Risa Tsumugi, the final member to join the band. Tsumugi hosts the RAS-themed Radio R･I･O･T program with Reo Kurachi. In the English dub, she is voiced by Hilary Haag.

Reona Nyūbara
She is a fan of Pastel Palettes, regularly covering songs by the band and uploading them online; at one point, she waited in front of the stage all day during the World Idol Festival to see them perform.

Before joining RAS, Reona was a quiet honor student who wished to be able to express her true self. She receives this opportunity when she is recruited by Chiyu upon watching her Pastel Palettes covers, and she becomes loyal to the producer. Although she follows much of Chiyu's orders without opposition, Reona is aware and at times skeptical of her motives; for example, she does not force Rokka to join the band against her will and continues to interact with the other bands. Late in the Girls Band Challenge, when Masuki and Chiyu argue about the latter's increasing control over the band, Reona attempts to comfort Chiyu but is rebuked for being "useless". Stunned and disillusioned, she reverts to her withdrawn self and returns to Chiba. With the help of her bandmates and an apology from Chiyu, Reona rejoins the band.

Reona is voiced by Reo Kurachi. Kurachi and Risa Tsumugi co-host Radio R･I･O･T. Taylor Fono serves as her English voice actress.

Rokka Asahi
She has idolized Poppin'Party since the time she saw them perform at Space, and often meets up with the band to help with organizing their live shows. She initially played with some students from her middle school in Gifu Prefecture before moving to Tokyo, where she works in the Galaxy live house. Outside of the band, she is classmates with Ako and Asuka.

Inspired by Poppin'Party, Rokka seeks to find a band to perform with but her search does not lead to any success. When Tae is unavailable during the cultural festival, Rokka attempts to stall by playing a guitar solo, which later catches Chiyu's interest when video of the performance is posted online. Chiyu attempts to scout her to become Raise A Suilen's guitarist, but is quickly rejected by the panicked Rokka. When Rokka is dragged into auditioning anyway, she discovers the enjoyment in playing in a band but fails the audition as Chiyu feels she held herself back in her performance. Determined to join, she auditions again and succeeds, though she is initially given an interim label. After participating in RAS' music video, Rokka officially joins the band and is provided the moniker "LOCK" by Chiyu. She later befriends Mashiro over their shared enthusiasm for Poppin'Party and admiration for Kasumi, though they usually bicker over who is the bigger fan.

Riko Kohara voices Rokka. Rokka is voiced by Brittney Karbowski in the dub.

Morfonica

Morfonica consists of five second-year students at the prestigious Tsukinomori Girls' Academy. Similar to Poppin'Party, Roselia, and Raise A Suilen, Morfonica's cast members perform their own music. The band's name is a portmanteau of "morpho" and "symphonic".

Morfonica's members make their debut in Girls Band Party! second main story, which overlaps with their band story "Morfonica, To the Sparkling World"; their second band story "Fly with the night" concerns Rui's role in the band. The band's first anime appearance takes place in the spin-off BanG Dream! Girls Band Party! Pico: Ohmori.

The band's members host the weekly YouTube show Morfonical.

Mashiro Kurata
 is the band's vocalist. New to Tsukinomori after previously attending an ordinary middle school, Mashiro is a quiet girl who finds herself overwhelmed by the successes of her peers, which she struggles with until she forms the band. While she is not the band leader, she writes lyrics for Morfonica's songs. Nicknamed "Shiro" by her bandmates, Mashiro enjoys fluffy mascots like Michelle and has a tendency to daydream. She is a close follower of Poppin'Party, which occasionally results in squabbles with Rokka regarding whom of the two is the bigger fan.

After befriending Tsukushi and Tōko, Mashiro attends a mini-live at CiRCLE that inspires her to create her own band, including putting up recruitment posters and writing about her ambitions into a guestbook at the live house. Hoping that it would help her build confidence, she chooses to become the band's vocalist after watching Kasumi perform. However, a lukewarm reception to the group's debut live and her singing ability demoralizes her and she quits the band. Encounters with Tōko, who praises her lyrics' impact on the others and asks her to ponder if she truly wants to play music, and Kasumi, who elucidates on how much Poppin'Party means to her, convince her to rejoin the band. At the second Girls Band Party, the original five bands perform a song with what Mashiro and her friends wrote in the guestbook, reinforcing her desire to perform. Although Mashiro is initially intimidated by the CiRCLE bands when they meet at a sakura party, she befriends the other five vocalists after talking with them. She later bonds with Rokka and Ako over their respective interests in Poppin'Party and fantasy media, though Mashiro and Rokka tend to quarrel over which of them loves the band more.

Mashiro is voiced by Amane Shindō, the youngest voice actress in the BanG Dream! franchise.

Tōko Kirigaya
 is the band's guitarist. She plays an ESP Arrow. An outgoing and friendly girl, she is popular on social media and at school, having been in the Tsukinomori education system since kindergarten. With her strong social media presence, Tōko is always eager to learn about the next biggest trend. Her family runs a kimono store, so she is knowledgeable about fashion and provides costumes for the band. She is also in her school's track and field club.

Tōko meets Mashiro and Tsukushi at the CiRCLE mini-live and agrees to start the band, becoming their guitarist as she likes the attention that the instrument brings. After she struggles in the band's early performances, she, Mashiro, and Tsukushi argue until Mashiro runs away; when Tōko encounters Mashiro again, she apologizes for her lack of practice and being a burden, but urges Mashiro to return. Upon reconciling, she realizes how much she enjoys playing the guitar and begins practicing more frequently at home. Tōko and Nanami later design Morfonica's costumes ahead of their performance at the school music festival. Her carefree personality often clashes with Rui, as evidenced in an argument when Rui rebukes her request to play a difficult phrase in one of the band's songs, but she is headstrong in her efforts. She becomes friends with Himari and Lisa, who recognize her from her online activity, while her family is familiar with Ran's as the Mitakes were customers at the Kirigayas' shop.

She is voiced by Hina Suguta. Suguta is a host of the Morfonica-based YouTube series Monica Radio with Yūka Nishio.

Nanami Hiromachi
 is the band's bassist who plays an ESP Bottom Bump. The daughter of a sculptor and painter, Nanami is gifted but her successes cause her to be ostracized by her peers, prompting her to hope for a normal life. In spite of this, she often shows signs of her skills such as quickly learning how to arrange music. The band practices at her parents' atelier. Outside of music, Nanami enjoys collecting toys and free prizes that are packaged with snacks.

She joins the previously-unnamed Morfonica after being spotted listening to the group decide their instruments, figuring that playing in a band is "normal" despite having no prior experience with the bass. When the band is jeopardized by Mashiro quitting, Nanami is unable to speak to her until she talks with Rui, who deduces that Nanami had been suppressing her talents to appear normal, yet her quick and smooth entrance into music is an indicator that her skills continue to linger. After the band reunites, Nanami and Tōko collaborate to design Morfonica's costumes for the festival. She is a member of Tsukinomori's horror club, and their mutual interest in the genre enables her to easily befriend Rimi.

Nanami is voiced by Yūka Nishio. With Hina Suguta, Nishio hosts Monica Radio.

Tsukushi Futaba
 is the band's leader and drummer. As class president, Tsukushi aims to be a responsible leader, though she can be clumsy at times. Her father is a restaurateur who operates cafés and food trucks.

She becomes acquainted with her classmate Mashiro when she offers to help her adjust to life at Tsukinomori, and invites her to attend CiRCLE's mini-live in an effort to brighten her cynical attitude. Tsukushi becomes the band's drummer as she played the drums in her elementary school's marching band. When Mashiro is disillusioned by criticisms of the band on social media and questions her lack of help, Tsukushi confronts her and causes her to quit. Guilty about her actions, she struggles to reconnect and apologize to Mashiro. When Mashiro returns, Tsukushi warmly welcomes her back. She admires Aya as a fellow band leader. Tsukushi later takes a part-time job at Hazawa Coffee.

Tsukushi is voiced by mika.

Rui Yashio
 is the band's violinist. The best student in her class and a student council member, Rui is a polite girl with a realistic but blunt attitude.

Rui first encounters the band when she shuts down their classroom practice due to the noise they were making, but eventually allows them to proceed provided a student council representative is watching and provides the group with a song she had composed. However, she refuses to associate beyond supervising as she had stopped playing the violin years prior after losing to a young piano prodigy (later revealed to be Rinko, who was a family friend during their childhoods) at a music competition; when Mashiro leaves the group, Rui explains to her that she quit the violin as she felt her future with the instrument was bleak after the defeat, but adds Mashiro does not have to follow the same path with the band. Despite the band fracturing, Rui allows the others to continue practicing in class until Mashiro returns. Although she is skeptical of the band's path and stands by her initial decision to quit music, she agrees to join when the four convince her to consider playing for the enjoyment that comes with being in a band. Upon meeting the other bands, Rui becomes acquainted with Yukina as they share similar musical philosophies.

She is voiced by Ayasa.

Other characters

The owner of the live house Space (branded as SPACE) where the band Glitter Green often performs at. Simply referred to as "Owner" by her employees and participating bands, she is quite strict and has a no-nonsense personality. She was a guitarist in a popular rock band called Miraculous Scarlet, and opened Space to disprove the generalization that music venues are intimidating. Shifune eventually closes Space, but remains involved with the other live houses as an advisor; anime scriptwriter Yuniko Ayana also noted she has a grandchild. She later helps the live houses organize the BanG Dream! Girls Band Challenge.

Kasumi's younger sister and a student at Haneoka. Called "A-chan by Kasumi", she was a member of Hanasakigawa's swim club in junior high before transferring to Haneoka to prepare for college. At Haneoka, she becomes close friends with Rokka and Ako. She later helps Marina organize the finals for the Girls Band Challenge, which includes conducting interviews with the participating bands. Her voice actress Yuka Ozaki formerly co-hosted Bandori! TV with Aimi before Ami Maeshima took over.

A staff member at the live house CiRCLE and the main non-player character in the game BanG Dream! Girls Band Party!, where she tries to get five bands together for a multi-live event together with the player's help. Prior to working at CiRCLE, she was the guitarist in an all-girl band that sought to go professional, but broke up after realizing they were not having fun during their performances. In response to her band's failure, she joined CiRCLE to help raise awareness for other groups striving for success. She is a main character in the Girls Band Party! ☆ Pico spin-off anime, while she helps organize the Girls Band Challenge in the third season.

CHiSPA
CHiSPA is the band that Sāya was a member of in middle school. Like Poppin'Party, CHiSPA auditioned to play at Space and succeeded; for the live house's final concert, CHiSPA was the last band to perform before PoPiPa. CHiSPA's song "Be shine, shining!" appears in the first season of the anime as an insert song.

Natsuki is a third-year student at Hanasakigawa. She is the vocalist and lead guitarist and is friends with Sāya.

Satomi is a third-year high school student at Hanasakigawa. She becomes CHiSPA's drummer after Sāya's departure, and other members call her "Sato-chan". She is "quiet but her performance is flashy."

Fumika is the bassist of CHiSPA. She is a third-year high school student at a nearby high school.

Mayu is the keyboardist of CHiSPA. She is a third-year student at Fumika's school.

Glitter Green
Glitter Green (stylized Glitter☆Green) is a four-person band consisting of students from Hanasakigawa. Led by Rimi's older sister Yuri Ushigome, the band primarily performed at Space until its closure and the members' graduation. Prior to leaving high school, the four were part of the student council.

The members' voice actresses have starred together in the Bushiroad franchise Tantei Opera Milky Holmes. Their lone single "Don't be afraid!", which was used as an insert song during the first season, was released in collaboration with Milky Holmes on November 21, 2018. A second song "Glee! Glee! Glee!" also appears in the season.

In the English dub of the second season, Kara Greenberg voices much of the band, with the exception of Hinako, who is portrayed by Melissa Molano.

The vocalist and guitarist of Glitter Green and the elder sister of Rimi Ushigome. Yuri has a mature and benevolent personality, and was a member of Hanasakigawa's Swim Club. After graduating high school, she begins attending a college overseas but remains in contact with Rimi via text.

The drummer of Glitter Green. She is an energetic girl who likes to be physically affectionate, hugging and petting those she is friends with. Hinako also works with Rii at Edogawa Music, though her hyperactive personality regularly annoys Rii; in response, Rii orders her to remain quiet during the band's concerts to avoid raising a commotion.

The bassist of Glitter Green. Outside of the band, she works as a salesperson at Edogawa Music with Hinako. Rii carries a plush demon named "Debeko" that she occasionally uses to communicate with others.

The keyboardist of Glitter Green and the student council president before graduating. She connects with her fellow Hanasakigawa keyboardists by interacting with Arisa, including practicing and eating at ramen shops together, and being partly responsible for Rinko succeeding her as student council president.

References

C
BanG Dream